Basco is an unincorporated community in the town of Montrose, in Dane County, Wisconsin, United States. Basco is located less than 15 miles from Madison.

The community is named for Basco, Illinois. It once had a post office, which opened in September 1889.

Notes

Unincorporated communities in Wisconsin
Unincorporated communities in Dane County, Wisconsin
Madison, Wisconsin, metropolitan statistical area